1695 Walbeck, provisional designation , is a carbonaceous asteroid from the central region of the asteroid belt, approximately 19 kilometers in diameter. It was discovered on 15 October 1941, by Finnish astronomer Liisi Oterma at Turku Observatory in Southwest Finland, and named after Henrik Walbeck.

Classification and orbit 

The asteroid orbits the Sun in the central main-belt at a distance of 2.0–3.6 AU once every 4 years and 8 months (1,694 days). Its orbit has an eccentricity of 0.29 and an inclination of 17° with respect to the ecliptic. Walbecks observation arc begins the night after its official discovery observation.

Physical characteristics 

In the SMASS taxonomy, the carbonaceous asteroid is characterized as a Cg-type, an intermediate between the C-type and G-type asteroids.

Lightcurves 

In November 2006, a rotational lightcurve of Walbeck was obtained from photometric observations by French amateur astronomer Pierre Antonini. It gave a rotation period of 5.1607 hours with a brightness variation of 0.22 magnitude. Two similar periods were obtained by David Romeuf and by a team of Hungarian astronomers.

Diameter and albedo 

According to the surveys carried out by the Infrared Astronomical Satellite IRAS, the Japanese Akari satellite, and NASA's Wide-field Infrared Survey Explorer with its subsequent NEOWISE mission, Walbeck measures between 17.88 and 19.62 kilometers in diameter and its surface has an albedo between 0.037 and 0.051. The Collaborative Asteroid Lightcurve Link derives an albedo of 0.046 and a diameter of 19.60 kilometers based on an absolute magnitude of 12.5.

Naming 

The minor planet was named in memory of Finnish scientist Henrik Johan Walbeck (1793–1822), astronomer and geodesist at the old Academia Aboensis who used the method of least squares to derive a good value for the Earth's flattening. The official naming citation was published by the Minor Planet Center on 1 April 1980.

References

External links 
 Asteroid Lightcurve Database (LCDB), query form (info )
 Dictionary of Minor Planet Names, Google books
 Asteroids and comets rotation curves, CdR – Observatoire de Genève, Raoul Behrend
 Discovery Circumstances: Numbered Minor Planets (1)-(5000) – Minor Planet Center
 
 

Background asteroids
Walbeck
Walbeck
Cg-type asteroids (SMASS)
19411015